Nelson Arturo Liriano Bonilla (born June 3, 1964) is a Dominican former professional baseball second baseman. He played in Major League Baseball from 1987 through 1998 for the Toronto Blue Jays, Minnesota Twins, Kansas City Royals, Colorado Rockies, Pittsburgh Pirates, and Los Angeles Dodgers. In 1999, he played in one game for the Chunichi Dragons of Nippon Professional Baseball (NPB).

Before turning professional, Liriano played amateur baseball for Villa de Monte Llano. In 2007 and 2008, Liriano was the hitting coach for the Wilmington Blue Rocks, and served as the manager of the Burlington Royals from 2009 to 2011. As of 2019, Liriano is the hitting coach of the Northwest Arkansas Naturals, yet another Royals affiliate.

In a six-day span with the Toronto Blue Jays in 1989, Liriano broke up two no-hitters in the ninth inning. He had a one-out triple off the Texas Rangers' Nolan Ryan on April 23, then robbed Kirk McCaskill of the California Angels with a pinch-hit, leadoff double on April 28.

Liriano has three daughters and son: Cindy, Minelia, Minelly, and Jesse.

References

External links

Nelson Liriano at Baseball Almanac

1964 births
Living people
Chunichi Dragons players
Colorado Rockies players
Colorado Springs Sky Sox players
Central Valley Rockies players
Diablos Rojos del México players
Dominican Republic expatriate baseball players in Canada
Dominican Republic expatriate baseball players in Japan
Dominican Republic expatriate baseball players in Mexico
Dominican Republic expatriate baseball players in the United States
Florence Blue Jays players
Kansas City Royals players
Kinston Blue Jays players
Knoxville Blue Jays players

Los Angeles Dodgers players
Major League Baseball players from the Dominican Republic
Major League Baseball second basemen
Mexican League baseball players
Minnesota Twins players
Minor league baseball managers
Nippon Professional Baseball infielders
Omaha Royals players
Pittsburgh Pirates players
Syracuse Chiefs players
Toronto Blue Jays players